Under Western Eyes (French: Razumov: Sous les yeux d'occident) is a 1936 French drama film directed by Marc Allégret and starring Pierre Fresnay, Danièle Parola and Michel Simon. It is an adaptation of Joseph Conrad's 1911 novel Under Western Eyes.

It was shot at the Billancourt Studios in Paris. The film's sets were designed by the art director Eugène Lourié.

Synopsis
In nineteenth century Russia a student with ambitions to join the Czarist system unwittingly become embroiled in the assassination of an Imperial official.

Cast
 Pierre Fresnay as Razumov 
 Danièle Parola as Nathalie  
 Michel Simon as Lespara  
 Jacques Copeau as Mikulin  
 Pierre Renoir as Un Policier 
 Jean-Louis Barrault as Haldin  
 Raymond Segard as Kostia  
 Vladimir Sokoloff as Le recteur 
 Jacques Bousquet as Gregori  
 Raymond Aimos
 Michel André
 Romain Bouquet as L'aubergiste  
 Auguste Bovério as Babitchev  
 Jean Dasté as Georges  
 Roger Legris as Le photographe 
 Jean Marconi as Herbert  
 André Siméon as Le portier
 Madeleine Suffel as La bonne  
 Gabriel Gabrio as Nikita  
 Roger Karl as Le Ministre 
 Michel Audié
 Roger Blin
 Paul Delauzac
 Georges Douking
 Claire Gérard as La logeuse  
 Fabien Loris 
 François Simon

References

Bibliography 
 Gene M. Moore. Conrad on Film. Cambridge University Press, 2006.

External links 
 

1936 films
French historical drama films
1930s historical drama films
1930s French-language films
Films based on works by Joseph Conrad
Films directed by Marc Allégret
French black-and-white films
Films shot at Billancourt Studios
Films set in the 19th century
Films set in Russia
1936 drama films
1930s French films